Muriel Grace Patterson (née Quartermaine; born 20 September 1931) is a former Australian politician who served as a Liberal Party member of the Legislative Council of Western Australia from 1989 to 2001, representing South West Region. She was a farmer and small-business owner before entering politics.

Early life
Patterson was born in Katanning, Western Australia, to Grace Gertrude (née Harris) and Charles Lewis Quartermaine. She attended a state school in Woodanilling and later studied at Perth Technical College as an external student. In 1964, Patterson and her husband began farming at Tambellup, on what had previously been virgin bushland. She opened a craft-supply store in Albany in 1976, and eventually became the first female president of the local chamber of commerce. Patterson served on the state council of the Western Australian Chamber of Commerce and Industry from 1984 to 1988, including on the state executive from 1987 to 1988, where she was the first female member.

Politics
Patterson joined the Liberal Party in 1980, and served as president of the Albany branch from 1984 to 1987. At the 1989 state election, she ran in second place on the party's ticket in South West Region, and was elected to a term beginning in May 1989. Patterson was made deputy chairman of committees soon after entering parliament, and in May 1992 was also included in the shadow cabinet of Richard Court. However, she was not promoted to the ministry when the Liberal Party won the 1993 state election, instead being made government whip. Patterson remained a whip until her retirement at the 2001 state election.

See also
 Women in the Western Australian Legislative Council

References

1931 births
Living people
Liberal Party of Australia members of the Parliament of Western Australia
Members of the Western Australian Legislative Council
People from Katanning, Western Australia
21st-century Australian politicians
Women members of the Western Australian Legislative Council
21st-century Australian women politicians